Radiation resistance is that part of an antenna's feedpoint electrical resistance that is caused by the emission of radio waves from the antenna. In radio transmission, a radio transmitter is connected to an antenna. The transmitter generates a radio frequency alternating current which is applied to the antenna, and the antenna radiates the energy in the alternating current as radio waves. Because the antenna is absorbing the energy it is radiating from the transmitter, the antenna's input terminals present a resistance to the current from the transmitter.

Radiation resistance is an effective resistance, due to the power carried away from the antenna as radio waves. Unlike conventional resistance or "Ohmic resistance", radiation resistance is not due to the opposition to current (resistivity) of the imperfect conducting materials the antenna is made of. 
The radiation resistance is conventionally defined as the value of electrical resistance that would dissipate the same amount of power as heat, as is dissipated by the radio waves emitted from the antenna. From Joule's law, it is equal to the total power  radiated as radio waves by the antenna, divided by the square of the  current  into the antenna terminals: 

The feedpoint and radiation resistances are determined by the geometry of the antenna, the operating frequency, and the antenna location (particularly with respect to the ground). The relation between the feedpoint resistance and the radiation resistance depends on the position on the antenna at which the feedline is attached.
The relation between feedpoint resistance and radiation resistance is particularly simple when the feedpoint is placed (as usual) at the antenna's minimum possible voltage / maximum possible current point; in that case, the total feedpoint resistance  at the antenna's terminals is equal to the sum of the radiation resistance plus the loss resistance  due to "Ohmic" losses in the antenna and the nearby soil: 
When the antenna is fed at some other point, the formula requires a correction factor discussed below.
In a receiving antenna the radiation resistance represents the source resistance of the antenna, and the portion of the received radio power consumed by the radiation resistance represents radio waves re-radiated (scattered) by the antenna.

Cause 

Electromagnetic waves are radiated by electric charges when they are accelerated. In a transmitting antenna radio waves are generated by time varying electric currents, consisting of electrons accelerating as they flow back and forth in the metal antenna, driven by the electric field due to the oscillating voltage applied to the antenna by the radio transmitter.
An electromagnetic wave carries momentum away from the electron which emitted it. The cause of radiation resistance is the radiation reaction, the recoil force on the electron when it emits a radio wave photon, which reduces its momentum.
This is called the Abraham–Lorentz force. The recoil force is in a direction opposite to the electric field in the antenna accelerating the electron, reducing the average velocity of the electrons for a given driving voltage, so it acts as a resistance opposing the current.

Radiation resistance and loss resistance 
The radiation resistance is only part of the feedpoint resistance at the antenna terminals. An antenna has other energy losses which appear as additional resistance at the antenna terminals; ohmic resistance of the metal antenna elements, ground losses from currents induced in the ground, and dielectric losses in insulating materials. When the feedpoint is (as usual) at a voltage minimum and current maximum, the total feedpoint resistance  is equal to the sum of the radiation resistance  and loss resistance 

The power  fed to the antenna is split proportionally between these two resistances.
 

where 
 and 
The power  consumed by radiation resistance is converted to radio waves, the desired function of the antenna, while the power  consumed by loss resistance is converted to heat, representing a waste of transmitter power.  So for minimum power loss it is desirable that the radiation resistance be much greater than the loss resistance.  The ratio of the radiation resistance to the total feedpoint resistance is equal to the efficiency of the antenna.  

To transfer maximum power to the antenna, the transmitter and feedline must be impedance matched to the antenna. This means the feedline must present to the antenna a resistance equal to the input resistance  and a reactance (capacitance or inductance) equal but opposite to the antenna's reactance. If these impedances are not matched, the antenna will reflect some of the power back toward the transmitter, so not all the power will be radiated. For "large" antennas, the radiation resistance is usually the main part of their input resistance, so it determines what impedance matching is necessary and what types of transmission line would match well to the antenna.

Effect of the feedpoint 
When the feedpoint is placed at a location other than the minimum-voltage / maximum current point, or if a "flat" voltage minimum does not occur on the antenna, then the simple relation  no longer holds.

In a resonant antenna, the current and voltage form standing waves along the length of the antenna element, so the magnitude of the current in the antenna varies sinusoidally along its length. The feedpoint, the place where the feed line from the transmitter is attached, can be located anywhere along the antenna element. Since feedpoint resistance depends on the input current, it varies with the feedpoint. It is lowest for feedpoints located at a point of maximum current (an antinode), and highest for feedpoints located at a point of minimum current, a node, such as at the end of the element (theoretically, in an infinitesimally thin antenna element, radiation resistance is infinite at a node, but the finite thickness of actual antenna elements gives it a high but finite value, on the order of thousands of ohms).

The choice of feedpoint is sometimes used as a convenient way to impedance match an antenna to its feed line, by attaching the feedline to the antenna at a point at which its input resistance happens to equal the feed line impedance.

In order to give a meaningful value for the antenna efficiency, the radiation resistance and loss resistance must be referred to the same point on the antenna, often the input terminals.
Radiation resistance is by convention calculated with respect to the maximum possible current  on the antenna. When the antenna is fed at a point of maximum current, as in the common center-fed half-wave dipole or base-fed quarter-wave monopole, that value  is mostly the radiation resistance. However, if the antenna is fed at some other point, the equivalent radiation resistance at that point  can easily be calculated from the ratio of antenna currents 
 

Receiving antennas 
In a receiving antenna, the radiation resistance represents the source resistance of the antenna as a (Thevenin equivalent) source of power. Due to electromagnetic reciprocity, an antenna has the same radiation resistance when receiving radio waves as when transmitting. If the antenna is connected to an electrical load such as a radio receiver, the power received from radio waves striking the antenna is divided proportionally between the radiation resistance and loss resistance of the antenna and the load resistance.
The power dissipated in the radiation resistance is due to radio waves reradiated (scattered) by the antenna.  Maximum power is delivered to the receiver when it is impedance matched to the antenna. If the antenna is lossless, half the power absorbed by the antenna is delivered to the receiver, the other half is reradiated.

Radiation resistance of common antennas 
In all of the formulas listed below, the radiation resistance is the so-called "free space" resistance, which the antenna would have if it were mounted several wavelengths distant from the ground (not including the distance to an elevated counterpoise, if any). Installed antennas will have higher or lower radiation resistances if they are mounted near the ground (less than 1 wavelength) in addition to the loss resistance from the antenna's near electrical field that penetrates the soil.

{| class="wikitable"  
|+  
! Antenna type
! Radiation resistance(ohms)
! Source
|-
| Center-fed half-wave dipole
|style="text-align:center;"| 73.1 
| 
|-
| Short dipole of length 
|style="text-align:center;"| 
| 
|-
| Base-fed quarter-wave monopole
|style="text-align:center;"| 36.5
| 
|-
| Short monopole of length over perfectly conducting ground 
|style="text-align:center;"| 
| 
|-
| Resonant loop antenna, a little over circumference
|style="text-align:center;"| ~100
| 
|-
| Small loop of area  with  turns(circumference )
|style="text-align:center;"| 
| 
|-
| Small loop of area  with  turns on a ferritecore of effective relative permeability 
|style="text-align:center;"| 
| 
|}
The above figures assume the antennas are made of thin conductors and sufficiently far away from large metal structures, that the dipole antennas are sufficiently far above the ground, and the monopoles are mounted over a perfectly conducting ground plane.

The half-wave dipole's radiation resistance of 73 ohms is near enough to the characteristic impedance of common 50 Ohm and 75 Ohm coaxial cable that it can usually be fed directly without need of an impedance matching network. This is one reason for the wide use of the half wave dipole as a driven element in antennas.

Relationship of monopoles and dipoles 
The radiation resistance of a monopole antenna created by replacing one side of a dipole antenna by a perpendicular ground plane is one-half of the resistance of the original dipole antenna. This is because the monopole radiates only into half the space, the space above the plane, so the radiation pattern is identical to half of the dipole pattern and therefore with the same input current it radiates only half the power.

This is not obvious from the formulas in the table because the different lengths use the same symbol,  the derived monopole antenna, however, is only half the length of the original dipole antenna. This can be shown by calculating the radiation resistance of a short dipole (length ), which is twice the length of the corresponding monopole:
 (dipole length ).
Comparing this to the formula for the short monopole shows the dipole has double the radiation resistance of the monopole:
 (monopole of length ).
This confirms the consistency of physically modelling a center-fed dipole as two monopoles, placed end-to-end, with adjacent feedpoints.

Calculation 
Calculating the radiation resistance of an antenna directly from the reaction force on the electrons is very complicated, and presents conceptual difficulties in accounting for the self-force of the electron.  Radiation resistance is instead calculated by computing the far-field radiation pattern of the antenna, the power flux (Poynting vector) at each angle, for a given antenna current. This is integrated over a sphere enclosing the antenna to give the total power  radiated by the antenna. Then the radiation resistance is calculated from the power by conservation of energy, as the resistance the antenna must present to the input current to absorb the radiated power from the transmitter, using Joule's law

Small antennas 
Electrically short antennas, antennas with a length much less than a wavelength, make poor transmitting antennas, as they cannot be fed efficiently due to their low radiation resistance.

At frequencies below 1 MHz the size of ordinary electrical circuits and the lengths of wire used in them is so much smaller than the wavelength, that when considered as antennas they radiate an insignificant fraction of the power in them as radio waves. This explains why electrical circuits can be used with alternating current without losing energy as radio waves.

The loss resistance is in series with the radiation resistance, and as the length decreases the loss resistance only decreases in proportion to the first power of the length (wire resistance) or remains constant (contact resistance), and hence makes up an increasing proportion of the feedpoint resistance. So with smaller antenna size, measured in wavelengths, loss to heat consumes a larger fraction of the transmitter power, causing the efficiency of the antenna to fall.

For example, navies use radio waves of about 15–30 kHz in the very low frequency (VLF) band to communicate with submerged submarines. A 15 kHz radio wave has a wavelength of 20 km. The powerful naval shore VLF transmitters which transmit to submarines use large monopole mast antennas which are limited by construction costs to heights of about  Although these antennas are enormous compared to a human, at 15 kHz the antenna height is still only about 0.015 wavelength, so paradoxically, huge VLF antennas are electrically short. From the table above, a  monopole antenna has a radiation resistance of about 0.09 Ohm.

It is extremely difficult to reduce the loss resistance of an antenna to this level. Since the ohmic resistance of the huge ground system and loading coil cannot be made lower than about 0.5 ohm, the efficiency of a simple vertical antenna is below 20%, so more than 80% of the transmitter power is lost in the ground resistance. To increase the radiation resistance, VLF transmitters use huge capacitively top-loaded antennas such as umbrella antennas and flattop antennas, in which an aerial network of horizontal wires is attached to the top of the vertical radiator to make a 'capacitor plate' to ground, to increase the current in the vertical radiator. However this can only increase the efficiency to 50–70% at most.

Small receiving antennas, such as the ferrite loopstick antennas used in AM radios, also have low radiation resistance, and thus produce very low output. However at frequencies below about 20 MHz this is not such a problem, since a weak signal from the antenna can simply be amplified in the receiver.

Definition of variables 
{| class="wikitable"
! Symbol || Unit || Definition
|-
|align=center| || meter (m) || Wavelength of radio waves
|-
|align=center| ||align=center|  || math constant ≈ 3.142
|-
|align=center| ||align=center|  || Effective relative permeability of ferrite rod in antenna
|-
|align=center| ||align=center| square meter(m2) || Cross sectional area of loop antenna
|-
|align=center| || hertz (Hz) || Frequency of radio waves
|-
|align=center| || ampere (A) || RMS current into antenna terminals
|-
|align=center| || ampere (A) || Maximum RMS current in antenna element 
|-
|align=center| || ampere (A) || RMS current at an arbitrary point in antenna element 
|-
|align=center| || meter (m) || Length of antenna
|-
|align=center|||align=center|  || Number of wire turns in loop antenna 
|-
|align=center| || watt (W) || Electric power delivered to antenna terminals 
|-
|align=center| || watt (W) || Power radiated as radio waves by antenna 
|-
|align=center| || watt (W) || Power consumed in loss resistances of antenna 
|-
|align=center| || ohm || Radiation resistance of antenna
|-
|align=center| || ohm || Equivalent loss resistance of antenna at input terminals
|-
|align=center| || ohm || Input resistance of antenna
|-
|align=center| || ohm || Radiation resistance at point of maximum current in antenna
|-
|align=center| || ohm || Radiation resistance at arbitrary point in antenna
|-
|}

See also
Antenna efficiency
Impedance of free space

Footnotes

References

Sources 

Antennas (radio)